Wen Yin Liang  (Rukai: Leheane Palray; or Rachel Liang born 8 April 1987) is a Taiwanese Mandopop singer.

Discography

Collaborations
 "Forgotten Happiness" (幸福的忘記) (2013) with Eric Suen from his 11th Mandarin studio album Love.. Actually as well from her first EP Don't Wanna Be Friends After Breakup.

References

External links

 
 
 

1987 births
Living people
Taiwanese television actresses
Taiwanese film actresses
21st-century Taiwanese singers
21st-century Taiwanese women singers
Rukai people